The Spatial AKA Orchestra is a music ensemble led by Jerry Dammers of The Specials, an English 2 Tone ska band popular in the late 1970s (which also went by the name the Special AKA). Dammers formed the orchestra in 2006 as a tribute to American jazz musician Sun Ra, though it grew to include other genres such as reggae, funk, and classical music.

The shows are as much about theater as music. At a festival in Norwich, England, Dammers donned a golden mask behind a row of keyboards on a stage cluttered with Egyptian mannequins, astronauts, and spaceships. The rest of the band emerged disguised as aliens and superheroes. Over 20 band members populated the stage during the night including Denys Baptiste, Larry Bartley, Roger Beaujolais, and Finn Peters. A similar show took place at the Barbican in London. The band played cover versions of Sun Ra's songs before covering the Specials, other work by Dammer, and ska music. Performers included poet Anthony Joseph, former Specials vocalist Francine Luce, Jamaican singer Cornell Campbell, and trombonist Rico Rodriguez.

Personnel
 Alcyona Mick – piano
 Anthony Joseph – vocals
 Crispin Spry Robinson – percussion
 Denys Baptiste – tenor sax
 Finn Peters – flute
 Francine Luce – vocals
 Harry Brown – trombone
 Rico Rodriguez - trombone, vocals
 Jason Yarde – soprano sax
 Jerry Dammers – keyboards
 Nathaniel Facey – alto sax
 Ollie Bayley – bass
 Patrick Hatchett – guitar
 Patrick Illingworth – drums
 Reuben Fox – tenor sax /flute
 Robin Hopcraft – trumpet
 Roger Beaujolais – vibes
 Shabaka Hutchings – bass clarinet
 Terry Edwards – baritone sax
  Larry Stabbins - saxophones
 Zoe Rahman - piano
 Neil Charles - double bass
 Mat Fox - baritone saxophone
 Guy R Clark - guitar
 Steve Gibson - classical percussion, vibes

References

External links
 Official site
 Article at the Guardian.

English ska musical groups
British reggae musical groups
Modern big bands
British jazz ensembles
Jazz fusion ensembles
Swing revival ensembles